

Cities and Towns

Townships

Places: S